Blackball pool (sometimes written black ball), also known as English pool, English eight-ball or simply reds and yellows, is a pool game originating in the United Kingdom and popularized across Europe and The Commonwealth,  such as Australia and South Africa. In the UK and Ireland it is usually called simply "pool".

Blackball is a standardized version of the English version of eight-ball. The two main sets of playing rules are those of the World Pool-Billiard Association (WPA), known as "blackball rules", and the older code of the World Eightball Pool Federation (WEPF), often referred to as "world rules".

History
American-style eight-ball arose around 1900, derived from basic pyramid pool.
In 1925, the Brunswick-Balke-Collender Company began offering ball sets specifically for the game using unnumbered yellow and red balls (in contrast to the numbered  and  found in most pool ball sets), a black , and the white cue ball. These were introduced to make it easier for spectators to identify the two sets in early professional games held in casinos, and became known as "casino-style" sets. In the years following World War II, playing eight-ball on small coin-operated pool tables became a common pub game in American bars, a pastime which spread to Britain by the early 1960s. In the years following, the British game diverged from the American in equipment (including the use of casino-style balls, which had died out in the US) and rules.

Equipment 

The game uses unnumbered, solid-coloured object balls, typically red and yellow, with one black ball. The black ball typically bears a number "8", though numberless variants are not unknown. They are usually 2 inches (51 mm) or  inches (52 mm) in diameter – the latter being the same size as the balls used in snooker and English billiards – often with a slightly smaller cue ball, e.g.  inches (47.6 mm) for a 2-inch set, a convention originally created for the ball return mechanisms in coin-operated tables. 

British pool tables come in 6 × 3 foot (1.8 × 0.9 m) or 7 × 3.5 ft (2.12 × 1.06 m) varieties, with 7 feet being the regulation size for league play. The table has pockets just larger than the balls and rounded, as in the game of snooker, whereas the international-style (or "American-style") table has pockets significantly wider, with pointed .

Rules

There are two competing standards bodies that have issued international rules. The older of the two sets in British-style pool are the World Eightball Pool Federation (WEPF) rules (often called "World Rules"). The majority of WEPF members come from the UK and Ireland, and from current and former Commonwealth of Nations countries, plus a few leagues elsewhere.

A competing but very similar set of rules has been promulgated by the larger World Pool-Billiard Association (WPA), under the game name "blackball" to better distinguish it from the American-style game (for which the WPA also promulgates the world-standardised rules). It was intended that "blackball" would unify the various existing British-style rulesets (presumably also including the WEPF rules) although this has not yet happened. The governing body for WPA blackball in Europe, with numerous national and local affiliate groups, is the European Blackball Association (EBA).

WEPF World Rules 
The older WEPF rules pre-date the WPA blackball rules, and remain popular as amateur league rules in the UK, Ireland, Australia, some other Commonwealth countries, and a few European nations. World rules are no longer played at the professional level, since the International Professional Pool Association (IPA) switched to WPA blackball rules in 2012. Locally the WEPF rules (or minor variants thereof) are sometimes referred to as "British standard pool", "Irish standard pool", etc. , WEPF leagues exist in: Australia, Belgium, China, Cyprus, France, India, Japan, Malta, Morocco, New Zealand, Ireland, Reunion Island, South Africa and the UK (with separate leagues in the Channel Islands, England, Northern Ireland, Scotland and Wales).

A "fair break" is one in which an object ball is potted, and/or at least 4 object balls contact the cushion. If the cue ball is potted on an otherwise fair break, it is a "non-standard"  (foul) that simply ends the breaker's turn, with no further penalties. If it is a foul (non-fair) break, the incoming player gets  as with other "standard fouls" (see below), and gets to break, after a re-rack, without the option to instead play the balls as they lie. Openness of the table (unlike in the American-style game) does not last long, in that if the breaker pots a ball on the break from one group, and elects to continue shooting that group, then that group are his/her balls-on, even if the post-break follow-up shot is missed, while if the group chosen did not have any balls potted on the break, the table remains open until a ball is legally potted. If no balls were potted on the break, the table remains open. The shooter must nominate what group they are shooting for on the shot following the break if they had potted a ball off the break.

A legal (non-break) shot is one where the cue ball first hits a "" (one of the balls in the player's own group), and does not pot the cue ball, the black or any of the balls in the opponent's group, and either one of the shooter's balls-on is pocketed, or a (any) ball contacts a cushion after the cue ball contacts the (first) ball-on. I.e., it is the same as in American-style, but with the additional requirement that one not sink an opponent's ball (doing so is a foul), and lacking the requirement that ball and pocket have to be called (i.e.  are perfectly valid, even on the black.) There are other forms of foul, generally the same as in other pool games, such as potting the cue ball (except on the break, as noted above), knocking balls off the table, moving balls accidentally, double-hits and pushes (though the standards are weaker than in American-style rules), unsportsmanlike conduct, etc. Also, all deliberate jump shots that result in missing an intervening ball are fouls.

After a foul, the offending player will effectively miss a turn and give the opponent .

WPA Blackball World Standardised Rules 

Blackball rules are similar in gameplay to (though worded differently from) the WEPF World Rules. 

Notable differences are:

Unlike in World Rules, deliberate fouls are illegal in Blackball.

"The skill shot". Blackball Rules enable an opponent's ball be potted legally at any time during the frame; provided one of your own colours is also potted during the same shot, this is called a skill shot and is illegal in World Rules.

After a foul in Blackball Rules, the incoming player has one free shot (they may accept the cue ball in-position as it lies on the table, or take cue ball in-hand, and place it in baulk) where they may legally play any ball. Following the free shot, the player will have one visit remaining regardless of the free shot outcome. This is unlike World Rules whereby, following a foul the incoming player will have two visits that carry and can only move the cueball in the case of a foul snooker.

World Championships 
Both the World Pool-Billiard Association (with the PPPO and Blackball International) and the World Eightball Pool Federation currently sanction a World Championship, the WPA version is held every other year. 
The official WPA sanctioned 2022 World Blackball Championships will be held in Tangier, Morocco in October of that year.

References

External links
 World Pool-Billiard Association (WPA) — World governing body for numerous versions of pool, including "blackball rules"
 Blackball International (BI) — Governing body and organisers of the official biennial World Blackball Championships.
 International Professional Pool Players Association (IPA) — Professional tour organisers
 World Eightball Pool Federation (WEPF)—international governing body for "world rules"
 UK Blackball Pool—United Kingdom blackball pool resource
 Blackball Australia Pool Association—Governing body for Australian Blackball Pool

Pool (cue sports)